The Nastro d'Argento (Silver Ribbon) is a film award assigned each year, since 1946, by Sindacato Nazionale dei Giornalisti Cinematografici Italiani ("Italian National Syndicate of Film Journalists"), the association of Italian film critics.

This is the list of Nastro d'Argento awards for Best Supporting Actor. Romolo Valli, Leopoldo Trieste and  Alessandro Haber are the most awarded actors in this category, with 3 awards each.

1940s 
1946 – Gino Cervi – His Young Wife
1947 – Massimo Serato – The Sun Still Rises
1948 – Nando Bruno – Flesh Will Surrender
1949 – Saro Urzì – In the Name of the Law

1950s 
1950 – not awarded
1951 – Umberto Spadaro – Il Brigante Musolino
1952 – not awarded
1953 – Gabriele Ferzetti – The Wayward Wife
1954 – Alberto Sordi – I vitelloni
1955 – Paolo Stoppa – The Gold of Naples
1956 – Memmo Carotenuto – The Bigamist
1957 – Peppino De Filippo – Totò, Peppino e i fuorilegge
1958 – Andrea Checchi – Parola di ladro
1959 – Nino Vingelli – La sfida

1960s 
1960 – Claudio Gora – Un maledetto imbroglio
1961 – Enrico Maria Salerno – Long Night in 1943
1962 – Salvo Randone –  The Assassin
1963 – Romolo Valli –  Una storia milanese
1964 – Folco Lulli –  The Organizer
1965 – Leopoldo Trieste – Seduced and Abandoned
1966 – Ugo Tognazzi – Io la conoscevo bene
1967 – Gastone Moschin – The Birds, the Bees and the Italians
1968 – Gabriele Ferzetti – We Still Kill the Old Way
1969 – Ettore Mattia – La pecora nera

1970s 
1970
Umberto Orsini – The Damned
Fanfulla – Fellini Satyricon  
1971 – Romolo Valli – The Garden of the Finzi-Continis
1972 – Salvo Randone – The Working Class Goes to Heaven
1973 – Mario Carotenuto – The Scientific Cardplayer
1974 – Turi Ferro – Malicious
1975 – Aldo Fabrizi – We All Loved Each Other So Much
1976 – Ciccio Ingrassia – Todo modo
1977 – Romolo Valli – An Average Little Man
1978 – Carlo Bagno – In the Name of the Pope King
1979 – Vittorio Mezzogiorno – A Dangerous Toy

1980s 
1980 – Tomas Milian – La luna
1981 – Massimo Girotti – Passion of Love
1982 – Paolo Stoppa – Il Marchese del Grillo
1983 – Tino Schirinzi – Sciopèn
1984 – Leo Gullotta – Where's Picone?
1985 – Leopoldo Trieste – Henry IV
1986 – Gastone Moschin – Amici miei – Atto III
1987 – Diego Abatantuono – Regalo di Natale
1988 – Enzo Cannavale – 32 dicembre
1989 – Fabio Bussotti – Francesco

1990s 
1990 – Alessandro Haber – Willy signori e vengo da lontano
1991 – Ennio Fantastichini – Open Doors
1992 – Paolo Bonacelli – Johnny Stecchino
1993 – Renato Carpentieri – Puerto Escondido
1994 – Alessandro Haber – For Love, Only for Love
1995 – Marco Messeri – Con gli occhi chiusi
1996 – Leopoldo Trieste – The Star Maker
1997 – Gianni Cavina – Festival
1998 – Giustino Durano – Life Is Beautiful
1999 – Antonio Catania, Riccardo Garrone, Vittorio Gassman, Giancarlo Giannini, Adalberto Maria Merli, Eros Pagni, Stefano Antonucci, Giorgio Colangeli, Giuseppe Gandini, Valter Lupo, Paolo Merloni, Carlo Molfese, Sergio Nicolai, Corrado Olmi, Mario Patanè, Pierfrancesco Poggi, Francesco Siciliano, Giorgio Tirabassi, Venantino Venantini, Andrea Cambi – La cena

2000s 
2000 – Felice Andreasi – Bread and Tulips
2001 – Giancarlo Giannini – Hannibal 
2002 – Leo Gullotta  – Vajont – La diga del disonore
2003 – Diego Abatantuono –  Io non ho paura
2004 – Arnoldo Foà – Gente di Roma
2005 – Raffaele Pisu – The Consequences of Love
2006 – Carlo Verdone  – Manuale d'amore
2007 – Alessandro Haber – La sconosciuta and The Roses of the Desert 
2008 – Alessandro Gassman – Quiet Chaos
2009 – Ezio Greggio – Giovanna's Father

2010s 
2010
Ennio Fantastichini – Loose Cannons 
Luca Zingaretti – Il figlio più piccolo and La nostra vita 
2011 – Giuseppe Battiston – La passione, Figli delle stelle and Senza arte né parte
2012 – Marco Giallini – Posti in piedi in paradiso and ACAB – All Cops Are Bastards
2013 – Carlo Verdone – The Great Beauty
2014: Carlo Buccirosso e Paolo Sassanelli – Song'e Napule
 Alessandro Haber – L'ultima ruota del carro
 Ricky Memphis – La mossa del pinguino
 Giorgio Pasotti – Sapore di te, Nottetempo e Un matrimonio da favola
 Filippo Timi – Un castello in Italia
2015: Claudio Amendola – Noi e la Giulia
 Stefano Fresi – Ogni maledetto Natale, La prima volta (di mia figlia)
 Adriano Giannini – Senza nessuna pietà, La foresta di ghiaccio
 Luigi Lo Cascio – I nostri ragazzi
 Francesco Scianna – Latin Lover
2016 – Luca Marinelli – They Call Me Jeeg
2017 – Alessandro Borghi – Fortunata and I Was a Dreamer
2018 – Riccardo Scamarcio – Loro
2019
 Luigi Lo Cascio – The Traitor
 Fabrizio Ferracane – The Traitor

2020s 
2020 – Roberto Benigni - Pinocchio
2021 – Massimo Popolizio - Pinocchio
2022 – Francesco Di Leva and Tommaso Ragno - Nostalgia

See also 
 David di Donatello for Best Supporting Actor
 Cinema of Italy

References

External links 
 Italian National Syndicate of Film Journalists official site  

Nastro d'Argento
Film awards for supporting actor